Stephen Jerome Williams (March 10, 1968 – April 29, 2020), known by his stage name Stezo, was an American rapper and producer.

Career
Stezo was born Stephen Williams in 1968 in New Haven, Connecticut. He first appeared on the hip-hop scene as a dancer for the group EPMD. He appeared in the video for EPMD's single "You Gots to Chill" from their 1988 album Strictly Business. After this experience Stezo sought a career as a hip-hop artist on his own.

In 1989, Stezo signed a record deal with Sleeping Bag Records and released his 12-inch single "To the Max" and eventually a full album Crazy Noise. Stezo handled all rapping and production on the album. The single received some attention around the time it was released. The album charting at #37 on the Billboard R&B albums chart, and received praise for its very funky production and on-point rapping. The album's two singles both charted on Billboard Hot R&B/Hip-Hop Chart.

Despite the success of his debut album, Stezo didn't release more music for five years. In 1994, he released the single "Bop Ya Headz"/"Shining Star". Then in 1997 he released his follow-up album Where's the Funk At. The album received little attention and did not chart. In 2005, Stezo released a third album, C.T. (The Lost State), paying homage to his home state of Connecticut.

Stezo died in his sleep on April 29, 2020, at age 52, from heart complications.

Discography

Albums
Crazy Noise (1989) – U.S. Hot R&B/Hip-Hop Albums #37
Where's the Funk At (1997)
C.T. (The Lost State) (2005)
The Last Dance (2021)

Singles

References

1968 births
2020 deaths
African-American male rappers
Rappers from Connecticut
Musicians from New Haven, Connecticut
21st-century American rappers
East Coast hip hop musicians
Sleeping Bag Records artists
21st-century American male musicians
21st-century African-American musicians
20th-century African-American people